Elytranthe is a genus of flowering plants belonging to the family Loranthaceae.

Its native range is Assam to Southern Central China and Western Malesia.

Species:

Elytranthe albida 
Elytranthe arnottiana 
Elytranthe colletii 
Elytranthe dranensis 
Elytranthe petelotii 
Elytranthe pseudopsilantha

References

Loranthaceae
Loranthaceae genera